Esther Staubli (born 3 October 1979) is a Swiss football referee. An agronomist by trade, Staubli also lectures in a university. 

She was selected to referee the 2015 UEFA Women's Champions League Final. 

She also served as a referee for the 2015 FIFA Women's World Cup in Canada.

In 2014, she was voted fourth in the International Federation of Football History & Statistics (IFFHS) World's Best Woman Referee, behind winner Bibiana Steinhaus. 

Staubli refereed in the men's Swiss Challenge League for the first time in September 2014, after which she was complimented on her performance by FC Wohlen coach Ciriaco Sforza. 

In 2017, Staubli became the first woman to officiate in a Men's U-17 World Cup as a referee, when she took charge of group stage match between Japan and New Caledonia at the 2017 U-17 World Cup in India. 

In December 2018, Staubli was appointed to referee at the 2019 FIFA Women's World Cup in France.

References

External links

Profile at footballzz.com

Living people
1979 births
Swiss football referees
Sportspeople from Bern
Swiss agronomists
FIFA Women's World Cup referees
Women association football referees
UEFA Women's Euro 2022 referees